Ochetoxena is a genus of moths belonging to the family Tineidae. It contains only one species, Ochetoxena phaneraula, which is found in South Africa.

References

Endemic moths of South Africa
Myrmecozelinae
Monotypic moth genera
Lepidoptera of South Africa